Renaud Denoix de Saint Marc (born 24 September 1938 in Boulogne-Billancourt, Hauts-de-Seine) is a French lawyer.

Life 
From 23 April 1995 Renaud Denoix de Saint Marc served as head (vice-president) of the French Council of State as vice-president up to his retirement on 25 September 2006. He was elected on 29 November 2004, into the French Academy of Moral and Political Sciences, in the general section.  On 22 February 2007, he was appointed member of the Constitutional Council of France by president of the Senate Christian Poncelet.  In 2009 he was elected to the Académie Nationale de Médecine.

Education 
He was educated at Sciences Po then at the École nationale d'administration. He entered the Council of State in 1964.

See also
Law of France

References

|-

1938 births
Living people
People from Boulogne-Billancourt
Sciences Po alumni
École nationale d'administration alumni
Members of the Conseil d'État (France)
Members of the Académie des sciences morales et politiques
20th-century French lawyers
Grand Croix of the Légion d'honneur
Knights of the Ordre national du Mérite